On the Evening Side is the eighth studio album by Canadian country music artist Charlie Major. It was released on June 21, 2011, via EMI Music Canada.

Track listing

References

2011 albums
Charlie Major albums
EMI Records albums